Odarawu was an Alaafin of the Oyo Empire, who ruled briefly during the late seventeenth century. He was reportedly the first Alaafin to be rejected by the Oyo Mesi (the seven main counselors of state). 

Odarawu was the son of Ajagbo. He was on the throne for a short period of time. He was considered a man of bad temperament. According to Oyo legend his bad temper led him to being removed as king and also served as an educational warning and lesson to future kings on character development. 

Odarawu's major battle was also his first and last blunder on the throne. During his reign, he ordered the destruction of a town called Ojo-segi after one of its market traders (not realising to whom she was speaking) slapped him and accused him of being a thief. Subsequently, the Oyo masses found him unfit to be king and he was asked to commit suicide. 

He was succeeded by Kanran.

References

Samuel Johnson, Obadiah Johnson. The History of the Yorubas, From the Earliest of Times to the Beginning of the British Protectorate. P 169

Alaafins of Oyo